Bryum argenteum, the silvergreen bryum moss or silvery thread moss, is a species of moss in the family Bryaceae. It is one of the most common mosses of urban areas and can be easily recognized without a microscope.

Description

The species is silvery-green or whitish-green colored when dry. This is because the broadly ovate shaped single leaflets in the tip do not form chlorophyll. The costa extends beyond the middle of the leaf. In damp, undisturbed locations, the branches may also form a more horizontal growth habit. The upper cells of the leaf surface are elongated rhomboid shaped. The capsule of the sporophyte is short cylindrical, appears broader at the base and is dark red to black colored.

It has a high ability to tolerate drought and pollution of urban environments. B. argenteum is considered a desiccation tolerant species that can withstand total drying. While it is a common characteristic in mosses, B. argenteum was one of the first bryophytes experimentally determined to be desiccation tolerant.

Distribution and habitat
An adaptable plant, it has a cosmopolitan distribution and is found in Europe, North America, the deserts of Australia and in Antarctica.

It thrives in areas of high anthropogenic activity, growing on rocks, in gaps of paving stones, on asphalt, and on roadsides. It grows especially well in inner cities or in industrial areas. Being a nitrogen loving species, it is also found on nitrophilic soils in urban areas.  It is found growing among lawns as well as in other moss communities.

The species is often spread by vegetative fragments clinging to the shoes of people and the feet or hooves of animals.
Another method of spread is in the production and sale of liners. Liners infested with B. argentem, often in association with Marchantia polymorpha, are commonly grown in one region of the country, transported to another region to continue growth, and are shipped to a retail location before being planted. Plants have the potential to pick up or disperse these species at each point of transfer.

References

argenteum
Plants described in 1801
Cosmopolitan species
Flora of Antarctica
Desiccation
Urban planning